Firouz Mirza Nosrat ed-Dowleh (1818 – January 1886) Persian prince of Qajar dynasty, was the 16th son of crown prince  Abbas Mirza and full-brother of Khanlar Mirza.

Offspring 
Firuz Mirza had 5 children from his wife, Princess Homa Khanoum daughter of Bahman Mirza Baha od-Dowleh 37th son of Fath Ali Shah:

 From Princess Homa Khanoum:
 Prince Abdol-Hamid Mirza Farman Farma (1840 – 1892), governor of Kerman from 1881 to 1892. He had 2 children, one daughter and one son, Prince Abdol-Majid Mirza.
 Prince Abdol-Hossein Mirza Farman Farma.
 Princess Najm es-Saltaneh, founder of Najmieh hospital endowment in Tehran, mother of Mohammad Mosaddeq. 
 Princess Sarvar es-Saltaneh Hazrat-e Olia, married Mozzafar al-Din Shah Qajar had 2 children, a daughter and a son, Princess Fakhr ed-Dowleh mother of Ali Amini, and Prince Nasser al-Din Mirza.
 Princess Mahsoumeh Khanoum, married Abol-Ali Mirza (son of Farhad Mirza and Jahan Ara Khanoum), had two children, Jonaid Mirza and Essmat Saltaneh (Shah June)

Government Positions Held
Governor-General of Fars (1st time), 1835-1836
Governor of Kermanshah, 1836
Governor of Azerbaijan, 1837-1850
Governor of Fars (2nd time), 1850-1853 
Governor of Tehran, 1859-1860
Governor of Persian Iraq, 1875
Minister for War (1st time), 1868-1871 
Minister for War (2nd time), 1873-1874

References

Qajar princes
1818 births
1886 deaths
19th-century Iranian politicians